Transmembrane protein 158 is a protein that in humans is encoded by the TMEM158 gene.

Constitutive activation of the Ras pathway triggers an irreversible proliferation arrest reminiscent of replicative senescence. Transcription of this gene is upregulated in response to activation of the Ras pathway, but not under other conditions that induce senescence. 

The encoded protein is similar to a rat cell surface receptor proposed to function in a neuronal survival pathway

References

Further reading